A Midsummer Night's Dream is a 2017 film adaptation of the play A Midsummer Night's Dream by William Shakespeare. The film is a modern rendition that relocates the story from ancient Athens to present day Los Angeles.

Cast 
 Lily Rabe as Helena
 Hamish Linklater as Lysander
 Finn Wittrock as Demetrius
 Rachael Leigh Cook as Hermia
 Fran Kranz as Bottom
 Avan Jogia as Puck
 Ted Levine as Duke Theseus
 Paz De La Huerta as Hippolyta
 Saul Williams as Oberon
 Mia Doi Todd as Titania
 Charity Wakefield as Quince
 Charlie Carver as Snout
 Max Carver as Snug
 Justine Lupe as Flute

Production 
The film was adapted for the screen and directed by Casey Wilder Mott. The production companies were 5B Productions and Empyrean Pictures.

The film's original soundtrack, composed by Mia Doi Todd, features guest appearances by Tunde Adebimpe, Cut Chemist, Dntel, Miguel Atwood-Ferguson, Dungen, and others.

Release and reception 
A Midsummer Night's Dream premiered at the Los Angeles Film Festival in June 2017, where it received positive reviews.

The film was acquired for a theatrical release by Brainstorm Media and played at Landmark Theatres and other venues nationwide in the summer of 2018.

The film received generally positive reviews upon its theatrical opening. On review aggregator Rotten Tomatoes, it holds an approval rating of 65%, based on 17 reviews with an average rating of 6.4/10. Metacritic gives the film a weighted average score of 67 out of 100, based on 8 critics, indicating "generally favorable reviews".

References

External links 
 
 

2017 romantic comedy films
2017 films
American romantic comedy films
American romantic fantasy films
Films about Hollywood, Los Angeles
Films based on A Midsummer Night's Dream
Films set in Los Angeles
2010s English-language films
2010s American films